Nikolay Petrovich Bogdanov-Belsky (1868–1945) was a Russian painter.

Life
Bogdanov-Belsky was born in the village of Shitiki in Smolensk Governorate in 1868. He studied art at the Semyon Rachinsky fine art school, icon-painting at the Troitse-Sergiyeva Lavra in 1883, modern painting at the Moscow School of Painting, Sculpture and Architecture in 1884 to 1889, and at the Imperial Academy of Arts in St. Petersburg from 1894 to 1895. He worked and studied in private studios in Paris in the late 1890s.

Bogdanov-Belsky was active in St. Petersburg. After 1921, he worked exclusively in Riga, Latvia. He became a member of several prominent societies in including the Peredvizhniki from 1895, and the Arkhip Kuindzhi Society from 1909 (of which he was a founding member and chairman from 1913 to 1918).

Bogdanov-Belsky painted mostly genre paintings, especially of the education of peasant children, portraits, and impressionistic landscapes studies. He became pedagogue and academician in 1903. He was an active Member of the Academy of Arts in 1914. Realist art was strongly disfavored by the Soviet Union, compelling the artist to relocate to Riga in 1921. As a result of the Soviet Occupation of the Baltic States, Bogdanov-Belsky relocated to Berlin. He was killed on February 19, 1945 as a result of allied bombing. He was buried at the Berlin-Tegel Russian Orthodox Cemetery.

He was a member of the Russian Fraternitas Arctica in Riga.

Selected paintings

See also
 List of Russian artists

References

External links
ArtFira

19th-century painters from the Russian Empire
Russian male painters
20th-century Russian painters
1868 births
1945 deaths
Full Members of the Imperial Academy of Arts
Peredvizhniki
Deaths by airstrike during World War II
Soviet civilians killed in World War II
19th-century male artists from the Russian Empire
20th-century Russian male artists
Moscow School of Painting, Sculpture and Architecture alumni
Imperial Academy of Arts alumni